James William Breen (born 1947) is a Research Fellow at Monash University in Australia, where he was a professor in the area of IT and telecommunications before his retirement in 2003. He holds a BSc in mathematics, an MBA and a PhD in computational linguistics, all from the University of Melbourne. He is well known for his involvement in several popular free Japanese-related projects: the EDICT and JMDict Japanese–English dictionaries, the KANJIDIC kanji dictionary, and the WWWJDIC portal which provides an interface to search them.

His EDICT dictionary and WWWJDIC server have been described as "reliable and close to comprehensive". The 195,000-term lexicon is used by popular apps such as ImaWa (iOS) and AEDict (Android), and has been used to build other Japanese language learning sites such as Rikai and Jisho.org.

He remains a board member of the Japanese Studies Centre at Monash University.

References

External links 
 Jim Breen's home page
 The EDICT home page
 The WWWJDIC online Japanese dictionary

1947 births
Living people
Australian lexicographers
Academic staff of Monash University